Aubrey Funga (born 28 June 1990) is a Zambian professional footballer.

Career
Starting out at Nkana F.C., Funga soon joined Nchanga Rangers F.C. before spending three seasons at Zanaco F.C. He performed well for the team, netting 24 goals in his last season there. Shortly after, the forward penned a four-year deal to play for Ajax Cape Town F.C. of the South African Premier Division. There, he satiated his goal ratio with a consolation strike in a 2–1 loss to Maritzburg United F.C. Finally, Funga was released by the club and resorted to Lusaka Dynamos of the Zambian Premier League in the mid-season window.

References

Association football forwards
Zambian footballers
Living people
Expatriate soccer players in South Africa
1990 births
Cape Town Spurs F.C. players
Zambian expatriate footballers